Peter D. Harrison  (born 1955) is an Australian Laureate Fellow and director of the Institute for Advanced Studies in the Humanities at the University of Queensland.

Career

Peter Harrison holds a DLitt from the University of Oxford, a PhD from the University of Queensland, and master's degrees from Yale and Oxford. His academic career began at Bond University on Australia's Gold Coast, where for a number of years he was professor of history and philosophy. From 2007 to 2011 he was the Andreas Idreos Professor of Science and Religion at the University of Oxford.  During his time at Oxford, he was a fellow of Harris Manchester College and director of the Ian Ramsey Centre where he continues to hold a senior research fellowship.  He became the inaugural director of the University of Queensland's Institute for Advanced Studies in the Humanities in July 2015.  He is fellow of the Australian Academy of the Humanities, a corresponding member of the International Academy of the History of Science, and a member of the International Society for Science and Religion.  In 2003 he was awarded a Centenary Medal. He delivered the 2011 Gifford Lectures at the University of Edinburgh published as The Territories of Science and Religion and named winner of the 2015 Aldersgate Prize.  In 2014 he was awarded an Australian Laureate Fellowship to conduct a five-year research project exploring science and secularization. He delivered the Bampton Lectures at the University of Oxford in February 2019.

Writings

Harrison is best known for a number of influential writings on religion and the origins of modern science. He has argued that changing approaches to the interpretation of the Bible had a significant impact on the development of modern science. He has also suggested that the biblical story of the Fall played a key role in the development of experimental science. His earlier work traces changing conceptions of religion in the Western world. Harrison contends that the idea of religions as sets of beliefs and practices emerged for the first time in the 17th century. This earlier work on religion was revisited in his 2011 Gifford Lectures, where he argued that current conceptions of both "science" and "religion" are relatively recent Western inventions, and that contemporary relations between science and religion are to some extent already built into the categories themselves. Rethinking the relations between science and religion, on this account, is not a matter of considering relations between scientific and religious doctrines, but of rethinking the ways in which science and religion themselves are currently conceptualised.

Similarly, he also contends that the concept of Western values is a quite recent, 20th-century Western emergence, despite being traced back to classical antiquity and the New Testament. In 2017, Harrison demonstrated that the Credo quia absurdum was a quote misattributed to Tertullian in the early modern period as a part of anti-religious and anti-Catholic polemics.

Selected publications
After Science and Religion: Fresh Perspectives from Theology and Philosophy'. with John Milbank, Cambridge University Press, 2022. .
New Directions in Theology and Science: Beyond Dialogue. with Paul Tyson, Routledge, 2022. .
Science Without God? Rethinking the History of Scientific Naturalism. with Jon Roberts, Oxford University Press, 2019.  .
Narratives of Secularization. Routledge 2018.  .
The Territories of Science and Religion. University of Chicago Press, 2015.  .  The Gifford Lectures. Read an excerpt.
Wrestling with Nature: From Omens to Science. with Ronald Numbers and Michael Shank University of Chicago Press, 2011. .
The Cambridge Companion to Science and Religion. Cambridge University Press, 2010. .
The Fall of Man and the Foundations of Science. Cambridge University Press, 2007. .
The Bible, Protestantism, and the Rise of Natural Science. Cambridge University Press, 1998. .
'Religion' and the religions in the English Enlightenment. Cambridge University Press, 1990. .

References

External links
 Profile at the University of Queensland

Living people
Yale University alumni
Members of the International Society for Science and Religion
Fellows of Harris Manchester College, Oxford
Fellows of the Australian Academy of the Humanities
Academic staff of the University of Queensland
Recipients of the Centenary Medal
Academic staff of Bond University
Historians of science
Statutory Professors of the University of Oxford
1955 births